The 1993–94 Cymru Alliance was the fourth season of the Cymru Alliance after its establishment in 1990. The league was won by Rhyl. This season saw the league extend to 18 teams.

League table

External links
Cymru Alliance

Cymru Alliance seasons
2
Wales